Zebra-Man is the name of four fictional characters appearing in American comic books published by DC Comics.

Publication history
Jacob Baker first appeared in Detective Comics #275 (Jan 1960) and was created by Bill Finger and Sheldon Moldoff.

Kobra's Zebra-Man first appeared in Outsiders #21 and was created by Mike W. Barr.

Fictional character biography

Jacob Baker

Jacob Baker was a high-tech scientist whose machinery irradiated his entire body. It also gave him superpowers that enabled him to attract and repel anything besides metal (referred to within the story as "Diamagnetism"). With his body covered by black and white stripes and highlighted by a glowing aura, he became Zebra-Man. He went on a crime spree where he encountered Batman and Robin. During the first fight, Batman was accidentally irradiated by the same energy. Without an inhibitor belt, Batman was out of control with his diamagnetism causing Robin to go on without him. Batman soon took advantage of the diamagnetism and used it to attract Zebra-Man to himself and then attract both of them to Gotham City Police Department.

Kobra's Zebra-Man

When Kobra researches the origins of some of Batman's enemies and creates a strike-force called Strike Force Kobra to usurp Stagg Enterprises in his goal of world domination, one of the villains he creates is patterned after the original Zebra-Man. Unlike the previous Zebra-Man, this version lacks the aura of the first Zebra-Man and has a mohawk that evokes the image of his equine namesake. Kobra's Zebra-Man, alongside the other Strikeforce Kobra members, fights the Outsiders to a draw, but Zebra-Man escapes with Elemental Woman, Planet Master, Lady Eve, and Kobra. His colleague Spectrumonster does not survive the battle. When Strikeforce Kobra is reassembled, Zebra-Man is not seen.

He has been sighted in Alexander Luthor Jr.'s Secret Society of Super Villains during the Battle of Metropolis alongside his fellow Strike Force Kobra teammates Planet Master and a somehow-revived Spectrumonster.

Vortex

In 2011, The New 52 rebooted the DC Universe. A version of Zebra-Man first appears as an inmate of Arkham Asylum, currently going by the moniker "Vortex". He is one of the many prisoners attempting to escape in a massive breakout attempt, which is stopped by Batman. He later appears attempting to help Catwoman escape her incarceration in the asylum, but is physically beaten by her.

Vortex appears in the DC Rebirth reboot, but is renamed Zebra Man. This version sports short hair with black leather gloves, boots, and shorts. Zebra Man is one of the many villains taken down by Batman and Catwoman after he takes her along with him on an average night of his job.

In the "Watchmen" sequel "Doomsday Clock", Zebra Man's Vortex appearance was seen as an inmate at Arkham Asylum at the time when Batman incarcerated Rorschach there. He protects Rorschach from the other inmates.

Vortex was later seen in Zambia partaking in a card game with Fiddler, Psych, and Shrike. When Psych detected that Fiddler cheated, Fiddler is held at gunpoint only for all of them to be killed by the projections of the people they killed.

Menagerie's Zebra-Man
During the "Forever Evil" storyline, a different Zebra-Man appears as a member of Cheetah's Menagerie. He was among those frozen by Killer Frost.  He'd later join an Anti-Task Force X group called The Revolutionaries before joining the Suicide Squad under their new supervisor Lok. <ref>Suicide Squad''' (Volume 6) #1-2</ref>

Powers and abilities
Zebra-Man I and II have the ability of diamagnetism which enables them to attract and/or repel matter besides metal. Both used an inhibitor belt to control their diamagnetism.

In other media
 The Jacob Baker incarnation of Zebra-Man appears in the Batman: The Brave and the Bold. This version's powers can affect metal objects.
 The second incarnation of Zebra-Man appears in The Lego Batman Movie'' as one of several villains who assist the Joker in his attack on Gotham City.

See also
 List of Batman family enemies

References

DC Comics metahumans
Fictional characters with electric or magnetic abilities
Characters created by Mike W. Barr
Comics characters introduced in 1960
Comics characters introduced in 1987
DC Comics scientists
DC Comics supervillains
Characters created by Bill Finger
Characters created by Sheldon Moldoff
Suicide Squad members